Kantonsschule Uster (KUS) is a gymnasium (senior high school) located in Uster, Switzerland, in the Zurich metropolitan area. Students come from several areas, including Uster and Dübendorf.

References

External links
 
  Kantonsschule Uster
  Article in German Wikipedia

Upper secondary schools in the Canton of Zürich
Uster
Buildings and structures in the canton of Zürich